Unwired: Acoustic Music from Around the World is a world music benefit compilation album originally released in 1999, with proceeds going to Amnesty International. Part of the World Music Network Rough Guides series, the release features global acoustic music, from traditional to pop. The compilation was produced by Phil Stanton, co-founder of the World Music Network, along with Amnesty, fRoots, New Internationalist, and NCOS.

Artists featured cover a broad range of countries, hailing from  The Americas (Argentina, Colombia, and the US), Asia (India, Japan, and China), Europe (Spain, Finland, and Scotland), and Africa (Cameroon, Zimbabwe, Sudan, Ethiopia, Senegal, Mali, and Cape Verde).

Critical reception

Writing for AllMusic, Alex Henderson called the album "unpredictable" as it does not only feature traditional music but global "contemporary, even cutting-edge pop". The record, according to Henderson, was "excellent" and "well worth obtaining".

Track listing

References 

1999 compilation albums
World Music Network Rough Guide albums